Tronstad is a hamlet south of Sylling in Lier, Viken municipality, Norway.

Villages in Buskerud